Yumiko Tsuzuki (都築有美子 Tsuzuki Yumiko born May 11, 1983 in Okazaki, Aichi) is a Japanese volleyball player who plays for NEC Red Rockets.
She served as captain of Toyota Auto Body Queenseis between 2007 and 2009.

On 27 June 2013 NEC Red Rockets announced her joining.

Profiles
She became a volleyball player at 10 years old.
Her nickname "Reg" is named after the Regulus which is the star of Leo.

Clubs
 OkazakiGakuen High School
 Chukyo Univ. 
 Toyota Auto Body Queenseis (2006-2011)
 NEC Red Rockets(2013-)

Awards

Team
2008 Empress's Cup -  Champion, with Toyota Auto Body.

References

External links
 Queenseis Official Website
 V.League - Biography

1983 births
Living people
People from Okazaki, Aichi
Japanese women's volleyball players